

Events

Births

Deaths
 Willem van Afflighem (born 1221), Flemish poet and abbot at Sint-Truiden

13th-century poetry
Poetry